Cordulegaster is a genus of dragonfly in the family Cordulegastridae. It contains the following species:
Cordulegaster annandalei 
Cordulegaster bidentata  – sombre goldenring
Cordulegaster bilineata  – brown spiketail
Cordulegaster boltonii  – golden-ringed dragonfly, common goldenring
Cordulegaster brevistigma 
Cordulegaster diadema  – Apache spiketail
Cordulegaster diastatops  – delta-spotted spiketail
Cordulegaster dorsalis  – Pacific spiketail
Cordulegaster erronea  – tiger spiketail
Cordulegaster helladica 
Cordulegaster heros  – balkan goldenring
Cordulegaster insignis 
Cordulegaster jinensis 
Cordulegaster lunifera 
Cordulegaster maculata  – twin-spotted spiketail
Cordulegaster magnifica 
Cordulegaster mzymtae 
Cordulegaster nachitschevanica 
Cordulegaster obliqua  – arrowhead spiketail
Cordulegaster orientalis 
Cordulegaster parvistigma 
Cordulegaster picta  – Turkish goldenring
Cordulegaster plagionyx 
Cordulegaster princeps 
Cordulegaster sarracenia 
Cordulegaster sayi  – Say's spiketail
Cordulegaster talaria  – Ouachita spiketail
Cordulegaster trinacriae  – Italian goldenring
Cordulegaster vanbrinkae 
Cordulegaster virginiae

References

External links

Cordulegastridae
Anisoptera genera
Taxa named by William Elford Leach
Taxonomy articles created by Polbot